Blepephaeus malaccensis is a species of beetle in the family Cerambycidae. It was described by Stephan von Breuning in 1935. It is known from Borneo and Malaysia.

References

Blepephaeus
Beetles described in 1935